Ace of Base is a Swedish pop group, formed in 1990, originally consisting of siblings Jonas, Linn, and Jenny Berggren, with Ulf Ekberg.

They achieved worldwide success following the release of their debut album Happy Nation in 1992. Later re-issued as The Sign, it was certified nine times platinum in the United States and was the best-selling album of 1994. One of the most successful debut albums of all time, it was the first to produce three No. 1 singles on the Billboard Mainstream Top 40 chart: "All That She Wants", "The Sign" and "Don't Turn Around".

They continued to score hit singles throughout the 1990s, with songs such as "Beautiful Life", "Lucky Love", "Cruel Summer" and "Life Is a Flower".  The group has sold 50 million copies of their first four studio albums, making them the third most successful Swedish group of all time, behind ABBA and Roxette.

Despite being largely inactive since 2012, the group has never officially disbanded.  In the last decade, they have released a number of demo tracks, first via their Facebook page, then in 2015 on the compilation album Hidden Gems. A follow-up called Hidden Gems, Vol. 2 was included in the 2020 boxset All That She Wants: The Classic Collection. Jenny Berggren continues to perform the group's hits in solo concerts around the world.

History

1987–1992: Formation
In 1987, following a number of years as part of a new romantic and punk cover band called G Konrad (named after a Hungarian author), Jonas Berggren formed a band with two friends, Johnny Lindén and Niklas Tränk, for a school project; his sisters Linn and Jenny later joined as singers. The new band went through several names: Kalinin Prospect after an avenue in Moscow; CAD (Computer-Aided Disco); and Tech-Noir, French for black technology, after a nightclub in the film The Terminator. They toured the clubs of Sweden with self-written material, techno inspired by 1980s Italodisco and house music.

Johnny left the group in 1989, and Niklas made his departure known by failing to turn up to a gig at Bältespännarparken in Gothenburg on August 4, 1990, instead attending a Rolling Stones concert on the other side of town. Jonas asked his friend Ulf Ekberg to stand in for Niklas. In an interview with Nöjesguiden, Jonas explained: "He shared a rehearsal room with us and we asked if he wanted to be with us on stage because he was really energetic. He thought it sounded fun and then we started writing. Ulf is very good at technology and I am more good at melodies, so it was a very good combination." Inspired by a Jamaican reggae band who resided in a studio next door to theirs, they experimented with a fusion of reggae and pop – dubbed "China reggae" by their Jamaican friends – which would become the band's trademark sound.

After responding to an ad in the paper Göteborgs-Posten, the new quartet started working in the studio with record producer John Ballard, and decided to come up with a new name in order to make a fresh start, as well as to avoid confusion with another band with the same name who were attracting bad reviews. Linn said: "No one could pronounce the name of the group and nobody could remember it." They settled on Ace of Base in early 1991, after Ulf was inspired by the Motörhead song "Ace of Spades". In an interview in 2018, Ulf explained: "The name came out of a hangover I had on New Year's Day. So, I was hungover, watching MTV and I saw Motörhead's video for their song 'Ace of Spades'. I liked the name and I thought I'd play around with those words. We're four members in this band, so I thought, 'Good. Four aces. I'll keep the ace.' Then I thought of our studio and how it's our base."

The group continued performing in the clubs of Gothenburg, but struggled to gain recognition, partly due to the preference of heavy metal over techno in their hometown, according to singer Jenny. They also sent out demo cassettes to numerous record companies but "everybody refused" to sign them. In May 1991, Jonas and Ulf made a trip to various record companies in Stockholm, including Polar Music, who wanted them to record more songs first, and SweMix, who were interested but didn't have the time to do anything with them until autumn.

In July, Klas Lunding at Telegram Records arranged for them to record a new version of "Wheel of Fortune" in their newly renovated Decibel Studio, but didn't offer them a recording contract. Jonas recounts: "When it had just been finished, Martin Dodd, (Head of A&R at independent Danish label Mega Records) called and shouted: 'Do not sign anything, do not sign anything!'. They wanted everything from us, while Telegram only wanted the reggae songs and no up-tempos.  We had already recorded a single with Telegram, but hadn't signed anything. Klas is not the fastest in the world, so to speak - and that was perhaps lucky for us. So Mega bought the master tape from Klas for 34,000 SEK." Martin Dodd remarked in a 1995 interview: "When I got the demo in my hand, I knew nothing about the group but I immediately loved the melodies. The melancholy in the songs and their way of writing. At that time, house music was big and this went completely against the flow. It sounded fresh."

"Wheel of Fortune" was serviced to radio and nightclubs in Sweden in early 1992, with it reaching Gothenburg's local Jockeytoppen chart in March, and prompting an invitation to perform on music television channel ZTV. However, the record failed to gain traction in Sweden, so Mega switched focus to Denmark. After servicing the single to media three times, it was finally released commercially at the end of June 1992, entering the Danish singles chart at No. 6, before rising to No. 2.

1992–1994: International success and Happy Nation/The Sign

Following the success of "Wheel of Fortune" in Denmark, the group continued working on music. After hearing Kayo's "Another Mother" in a record store, a top 20 hit in Sweden in 1990, Jonas and Ulf decided that it was exactly the sound they wanted to create. In early 1992, they sent producer Denniz PoP a demo tape including a song called "Mr. Ace". At first he wasn't particularly impressed, but the tape got stuck in the cassette player in his car. This resulted in him having to listen to it repeatedly and gradually he realized the song's potential. He'd lost the band's contact details but when they called him a few months later, he invited them to his SweMix studio to re-record the song in July 1992. The song became "All That She Wants", and upon its release at the end of August, it quickly climbed to No. 1 on the Danish chart, while the previous single was still sitting at No. 2. Keen to rush out an LP for the Christmas market, Mega Records pressed the band for an album, which was quickly recorded and mixed within a few weeks.

The album, Happy Nation, was released on November 2, 1992 in Denmark and its success prompted interest elsewhere in Europe. A pan-European licence was signed with Metronome/PolyGram (now Universal Music), but they were turned down by the American division. Within a few months, "All That She Wants" had reached No. 3 in Sweden and had spent eight weeks at No. 1 in Germany. In various European countries, "Happy Nation" and "Waiting for Magic" were released as further singles following the release of the album.

In May 1993, "All That She Wants" consolidated on its European success by topping the chart for three weeks in the United Kingdom. However, despite Mega Records's efforts to secure a distribution deal in the United States, the response was always the same: "This band will never work in the States." Eventually, Clive Davis, founder of Arista Records, heard the song playing on the radio whilst on vacation on his yacht, and rushed to sign a licence with Mega for the Americas. By the end of October, "All That She Wants" had made its way to No. 2 on the Billboard Hot 100, as well as in Australia.

The group had already started work on a second album, with the working title of The Sign, named after one of the new tracks they had written. Worried about sales of import copies of Happy Nation, however, Davis opted to tweak the track list of the original LP by adding three new tracks, and re-titling it The Sign. Released in the USA on November 23, 1993, it remained in the top three of the Billboard Top 200 for 26 consecutive weeks, and was nominated for Best Pop Album at the 1995 Grammy Awards. The refreshed album was released in Europe as Happy Nation (US Version).  Collectively, the different versions of the album reached the No. 1 position in at least 14 countries, and sold over 21 million copies worldwide, making it one of the best-selling debut albums of all time.

The second U.S. single was the album's title track, "The Sign", released on December 14. It was even more successful than the first, spending six weeks at No. 1 and becoming the best-selling single of 1994. It was also a major hit internationally, peaking at No. 2 in the UK and Sweden and at No. 1 in Germany; whilst in Australia it topped the charts for four weeks.

Recorded at the request of Clive Davis, "Don't Turn Around" was the group's next single, which had previously been released by Tina Turner as the B-side of her single "Typical Male", and had been a UK No. 1 hit for Aswad in 1988. The cover version hit the top 5 in the US, UK, Sweden, Denmark and Finland.

Promotion for the album concluded with the final single release "Living in Danger", which was yet another top 40 hit internationally and was performed in front of the Brandenburg Gate at the first ever MTV Europe Music Awards in Berlin in November 1994.

The band were caught up in controversy when on 27 March 1993, the Swedish newspaper Expressen reported that Ulf had been a member of a skinhead gang in his teenage years, long prior to his association with Ace of Base. The band and Ulf himself have addressed these claims numerous times. Linn remarked in 1993: "Ulf gave all that up long ago and my family had nothing to do with any of that in the first place." In 2013, the story was revisited in a report by Vice, referring to an unauthorized CD released in 1998 called Uffe Was a Nazi!, containing songs with racist content which were claimed to have been recorded by Ulf's former band Commit Suiside. In an interview with E! Online, Ulf clarified that Commit Suiside were "a New Wave music band without any political touch or agenda" and that the racist songs on the CD were not recorded by them. He also remarked: "I have always been deeply regretful of that period in my life, as I strive to bring happiness to people, and during that period I did not live up to that standard. [...] I'm truly deeply sorry for any hurt and disappointment this has caused for our fans, and I really hope that we clearly have stated that Ace of Base never shared any of these opinions and strongly oppose all extremist opinions on both the right and left wing."

In April 1994, an obsessed German fan broke into the Berggren family home, brandishing a knife. After managing to restrain her, the band decided they needed bodyguards.  Recalling the attack in a 2016 interview, Jenny said "She woke me up with a knife to my throat.  She broke into my parents’ house when I was staying there after two years away.  I woke up and she was standing over me with the knife.  I was terrified.  That was the darker side of fame.  I remember just after I was attacked I found out that we were Number 1 in the United States.  All I could think was that I almost got killed. Everyone was like, 'wow, let’s have a huge party'. I didn’t want a party. I was broken."

1995–1997: The Bridge

Following the substantial success of the first album, the group were offered the chance to perform at Madison Square Garden in New York, and were asked to front brands such as Pepsi and Reebok in promotional campaigns, but after two years of travelling around the world to promote the first album, the band were too exhausted and declined all offers. Simultaneously, their various record companies around the world were demanding a second album promptly. To hasten the process, instead of Jonas and Ulf writing most of the album, each member was encouraged to submit their own tracks for consideration.

In the end, 17 tracks were chosen for the second album, titled The Bridge. It marked a considerable change of direction in sound; alongside the reggae and dance sounds that had made the group so popular were more experimental tracks and several ballads. The lead single, "Lucky Love", however, was a mainstream pop record, and was premiered in August 1995 at the World Championships in Athletics in Gothenburg. It debuted at No. 1 in Sweden upon release in October, becoming their first chart-topper in their homeland. It was also a top 20 hit across Europe, peaking at No. 1 in Finland, No. 2 in Denmark, No. 13 in Germany and No. 20 in the United Kingdom.

Arista Records instead opted for the more up-tempo track "Beautiful Life" as the first single in the US, where it peaked at No. 15 on the Billboard Hot 100, becoming the first American hit for its co-producer Max Martin, who would go on to become one of the world's most in-demand songwriters and producers. It was released as the second single from the album in most countries, also reaching No. 15 in the UK and charting in at least 17 countries. An alternative acoustic mix of "Lucky Love" was chosen as the second U.S. single, peaking at No. 30.

The Bridge was certified platinum in 14 countries, but did not match the sales of the group's first album. "Never Gonna Say I'm Sorry" was released as the third single from the album and achieved moderate success in Europe, but  failed to chart on the Hot 100 in the USA. In February 1996, the band performed at the Viña del Mar International Song Festival in Chile, topping the bill alongside 2 Unlimited.

After touring Asia and Australasia in April 1996, the group temporarily retreated from the limelight, scrapping plans to release either "My Déjà Vu" or "Edge Of Heaven" as a single, and emerging only in 1997 for an April performance at the World Music Awards, and at a July concert celebrating the 20th birthday of Princess Victoria of Sweden.

1998–1999: Flowers / Cruel Summer

Having felt rushed to record a second album, the group were given as much time as they need to produce their third, with much of it being recorded in Jonas's own studio, "The Barn". Declaring it their best album yet, the group titled it Flowers because they believed that the songs, wildly different in style, including Motown and gospel influences, resembled a varied bouquet of flowers. Fans were surprised to see that singer Linn had relinquished lead vocal duties to sister Jenny, and on many promotional photos, Linn's face was blurred. They were reassured that Linn was happy with her new backing role in the group, and many reasons were given for her decision, including her having damaged her voice, her aerophobia deterring her from international travel and her dislike of fame.

The album's lead single "Life Is a Flower" was released in mainland Europe in April 1998, and became the most-played track on European radio of the year.  It reached the top 5 in Sweden, Denmark, Finland, Hungary and in the UK, where it was certified silver.  The album followed in June, hitting the top 20 in at least a dozen countries.

The group's British label London Records had requested the band record the 1983 hit "Cruel Summer" by Bananarama and it was selected as the second European single. Deciding that "Life Is a Flower" was "too European in nature", Clive Davis pushed "Cruel Summer" as the lead single for the United States, and it brought Ace of Base back into the U.S. Top 10 for the first time in four years, being certified gold. The album was also renamed Cruel Summer and featured a different track list from the European release. For this version of the album, Davis persuaded a reluctant Linn to record the Billy Steinberg-penned ballad "Everytime It Rains".

"Life Is a Flower" was re-recorded as "Whenever You're Near Me" and chosen as the second single from Cruel Summer, peaking at No. 76. "Travel to Romantis" and "Always Have, Always Will" were further singles in Europe whilst "Everytime It Rains" was issued as a single in the UK along with a repackaged edition of Flowers.

1999–2000: Singles of the 90s and Greatest Hits
The group went back into the studio in 1999, writing several tracks together as a quartet for the first time, and recording enough demo tracks for consideration for a fourth studio album.  Ulf from the group later revealed that they had hoped to release a track called "Pole Position" as the lead single, with a music video that would have featured the Formula One champion driver Jacques Villeneuve. Several of the tracks recorded for the scrapped studio album were eventually released in demo form by Jonas via Facebook in 2011.

In November 1999, Mega Records released the best-of album Singles of the 90s, a compilation of 16 hit singles. A new single taken from it, "C'est La Vie (Always 21)", was a modest chart hit in Sweden, Finland, Germany and Switzerland, and topped the charts in Spain. "Hallo Hallo" followed as the second single in parts of Europe, but only found minor success.

Arista Records fulfilled the group's four-album contract in the Americas by releasing Greatest Hits in March 2000. A new dance mix of "Everytime It Rains", previously included on Cruel Summer, was released as a radio single to promote the album. Both the single and album failed to chart in the USA.

2002–2003: Da Capo

Following a long time away from the pop scene, a new single called "Beautiful Morning" was serviced to radio in Europe in July 2002.  Polydor Records reported that it was their fastest-added track to radio playlists of the year, and it went on peak at No. 38 in Germany and No. 14 in Sweden upon its commercial release in September.

After several delays, Ace of Base finally released their fourth studio album, Da Capo, on September 30, 2002, in Europe, and in Japan through Toshiba EMI with a different cover and three bonus tracks.  The album received only a soft release in the United Kingdom and was not released in the Americas.  The title comes from the musical term da capo, which translates as "back to the beginning", chosen as the sound of the album was seen as a return to the group's early blend of reggae and europop.

Although the album charted across much of Europe, it was not as successful as previous releases. Only Jenny and Ulf went on a promotional tour of Sweden, Denmark, Norway, Finland, Germany, Poland and Austria. Jonas chose to forego promotional activities because "it was better to be two then" and led to "less questions" about Linn's lack of participation. Linn attended only one performance in Germany, which was her last public appearance.

"The Juvenile" was selected as the album's second single in Germany, and was used for a Christmas campaign by TV channel RTL.  The song was a re-written version of a track originally submitted for the James Bond movie GoldenEye in 1995.  However, Clive Davis persuaded the band that it was not the best move for the band at the time so they withdrew it from consideration.  In Scandinavia, Edel-Mega released  "Unspeakable" as the second single, but its poor chart performance ended the promotion of the album prematurely.

2003–2006: Hiatus
The group remained out of the spotlight throughout 2003 and 2004. During this time, Jenny performed solo live performances in several Christian shows with her husband Jakob Petrén and released an album as a vocalist with the Swedish group Arose.

In 2005, a handful of songs featuring vocals by both Jenny and Linn were recorded with producer Tommy Ekman, including "Would You Believe" and "Make My Day". Jonas and Ulf later explained that the group did not have the energy to finish the project, though the tracks that were recorded eventually surfaced.

At the end of 2005, the group reunited, without Linn, for several live performances at the Night of the Proms in Belgium, alongside other artists such as Donna Summer.

2007–2009: Reunion

Ace of Base reunited as a trio to perform their first full-length concert since 1996 in Yekaterinburg, Russia, on November 15, 2007.  They embarked on a world tour called Ace Of Base - Redefined!, which continued throughout 2008 and 2009.  The set list included several new versions of their greatest hits. Jenny confirmed Linn's permanent departure from the group, saying "She hasn't been part of Ace of Base for several years" in Se & Hør Magazine. Ulf later explained in an interview "She left the band and we promised her to never even ask to come back. She's done with entertainment industry. It's understandable. It's brutal from the inside, it was not for her. She has no craving to be famous, she loved her fans, but the fame factor was not for her." While touring, the group performed a brand new song called "Sparks From A Fire".

The group teamed up with Jenny's husband Jakob to record material for a new studio album, which would consist of seven new songs and seven remakes of old hits. However, this album did not see a release and a new compilation, Greatest Hits, was released on November 12, 2008, instead.

Five re-recorded songs were released from the album in various forms: "Lucky Love 2009", "Don't Turn Around 2009", "The Sign (Freedom Bunch Mix)" and "Wheel of Fortune 2009", which was released worldwide on October 24, 2008, as a digital single. A fifth reworking, "Happy Nation 2009", was released separately as a remix kit. A remake of "All That She Wants" was also recorded and featured guest vocals by Britney Spears that stemmed from her own 2007 cover of the song. This remake was never officially released, but leaked online in June 2016.

Three of the new tracks recorded in this period ("Sparks From A Fire", "The Mask" and "Wish You Were Mine") were eventually leaked on YouTube in 2017.

2009–2012: New members, The Golden Ratio, and Ace Thursdays

In August 2009, in an interview with Digital Spy, Ulf mentioned adding another singer to the group alongside Jenny, explaining: "We're just deciding now whether to add a fourth member to the group again or to bring it out under a new name. At the moment we think it would be stronger with two female singers, so it's a little technical problem to solve." During this time, Ulf and Jonas began recording songs with singer Julia Williamson, whom they met through Martin Dodd, who had originally signed the group to Mega Records. Meanwhile, a new remix of "Cruel Summer" by Rico Bernasconi charted at No. 69 in Germany.

Jenny published her autobiography Vinna hela Världen in Sweden in September and announced that she was recording a solo album, which materialized in October 2010 as My Story. In November 2009, Jenny confirmed via Twitter that she would not be involved with the upcoming album, but later clarified that she had not left, saying that "other constellations will have other names".

Two new singers were officially revealed in February 2010 as Clara Hagman, a contestant from Idol 2009, who Ulf met whilst appearing as a guest judge on the show, and Julia Williamson. Jonas explained that "We will reform how we write the band name so that all old Acers can see the difference and don't have to be in panic.", with Jenny commenting in April, "You are wrong about me leaving Ace of Base. I just want to make everybody sure I have not left the group. Ace of Base is still the original members. We are bounded by law and by heart."

In a later interview with Aftonbladet, Jenny claimed "They didn't want to be with me", and that she was not allowed to participate in songwriting. Jonas and Ulf then said in an interview with Scandipop that Jenny wasn't happy with plans to introduce a new member, and while she never formally quit the group, they felt that they had no choice but to proceed without her.

The new quartet maintained the original band name, but it was stylized as "Ace.of.Base" on the artwork of single and album releases. In July 2010, a track called "Mr. Replay" appeared on a Polish promo compilation for DJs, becoming the first release from the new line-up. The first official single from the line-up, "All for You", was premiered on radio station Antenne AC on July 22, and was released on CD and download on September 10, debuting at No. 38 in Germany.

The album The Golden Ratio followed on September 24, entering the German album charts at No. 20. In Sweden, the album failed to chart, backed only by a radio release of the album's title track "The Golden Ratio" in October, followed by a performance of "Southern California" on Bingolotto in April 2011. An acoustic version of the album was being considered but never materialized. No further singles were released in support of the album.

In March 2011, Jonas began releasing previously unreleased material to fans via the band's official Facebook page and the website ReverbNation on a semi-regular basis, in events they referred to as "Ace Thursdays". Writing sessions for new material took place throughout the same year, though following the group's tour of Canada and Brazil in 2011, new music was put on hold.

2012–present: Departures, Hidden Gems and 30th anniversary
Ace Thursdays continued throughout 2012, but were discontinued in May 2013. In November 2012, Jenny was quoted as saying, "The rest of the band are doing other things. ... We're just wishing each other luck at this stage. I have a dream that we'll get back together, so I don't want to bang anyone on the head". Jenny began touring as "Jenny from Ace of Base" alongside popular Eurodance acts from the decade.

In January 2014, Julia announced on her official Facebook page that she had left the group in 2012. She later confirmed that Clara had also left, saying on her Facebook page, "I never really left the group, one day I just didn't hear anything from them and it's the same with Clara. Like it went up in smoke; really strange". Clara has since gone to release a number of solo singles, and has collaborated with various EDM producers such as KREAM and R3hab.

A remix EP was released in July 2014, featuring new remixes of "All That She Wants". On September 27, Jonas announced that members were filming a documentary chronicling the production of "All That She Wants" at Google headquarters. The documentary was aired on the Swedish channel SVT as part of the Hitlåtens Historia series on March 18, 2015.

In December 2014 and January 2015, remastered versions of their first four studio albums, in both European and American editions, were released digitally. This was followed in March by Hidden Gems, a compilation album consisting entirely of demos and b-sides. "Would You Believe", one of the last tracks recorded by the original quartet in 2005, was released as a promotional single.

In a 2015 interview with ABC News, Ulf said of a future reunion, "With the right elements in the next few years, I don't think it's impossible"; however, in July 2016, Jenny remarked: "We won't re-form. [...] We're finished working together but we're not finished being family together. We have a lot of fun plans in the future but no musical plans". In 2018, Jonas said a potential reunion had been discussed, but noted "We always got the same question "where is Malin?". I am still writing music, maybe one song each fortnight or something. It's a lot of fun, like therapy. And maybe if we do a reunion... I have songs for it!"

In 2019, Demon Music Group began releasing new compilations of the band's material in the United Kingdom. The first of these releases was Ace Of Base – Gold, which charted at No. 59 in the UK, marking the group's first return to the UK charts in 20 years. To mark the group's 30th anniversary, a 12-disc box set called All That She Wants: The Classic Collection was released in July 2020. The set includes expanded versions of the group's original four studio albums and Hidden Gems, Hidden Gems, Vol. 2 – a new follow-up to the original Hidden Gems –, a new EP containing previously unreleased remixes of "Edge Of Heaven", and a DVD containing all of the group's music videos. Included among the 195 tracks are previously unreleased demos from the original line-up's final recording sessions in 2008 and live recordings of the group's first gig at Bältespännarparken in 1990. There is also a 4 LP coloured vinyl version of the box set, which only includes the four studio albums. Hidden Gems, Vol. 2 was released digitally in August 2020.

In 2020, Playground Records began releasing standalone digital singles which feature new remixes of the group's tracks. In November 2021, a remix EP was released for the album track "Dancer in a Daydream" which first appeared on Happy Nation in 1992. The EP features remixes by producer Trace Adam and was released alongside a new video with previously unseen footage.

In 2023, the group will release a 26-compact disc singles box set containing every single from their first four studio albums, Beautiful Life: The Singles.

Legacy
 A number of musicians and singers have been influenced by Ace of Base. Lady Gaga has said her album The Fame Monster was influenced by the "super pop melodies of the 90s" by acts such as Ace of Base. The song "Alejandro" in particular has been heavily compared to Ace of Base's version of "Don't Turn Around"; Paul Lester from BBC commented that "[Alejandro] moves at an Ace of Base pace", and Sal Cinquemani from Slant Magazine described the song as a homage to them; The song "Eh, Eh (Nothing Else I Can Say)" from The Fame has also been linked to the band; Alexis Petridis from The Guardian noted that the song "is the first song in a long time that warrants comparison to the œuvre of Ace of Base".

Katy Perry said she wanted her third studio album, Teenage Dream, to sound like "The Sign"; "It's what I said I wanted earlier", she told MTV; "We nailed it: It's roller-skating! It's '90s! It's Ace of Base! It's Cyndi Lauper! It's like all these colors and more".

Swedish artist Robyn said she was inspired by Ace of Base for her song "Dancehall Queen", which was produced by Diplo and Klas Åhlund for her fifth studio album Body Talk Pt. 1. "We were just having fun with that kind of genre music. And the idea of making this song came out of that discussion. It was fun. We really connected on something where music that you might put in one box becomes something else, depending on how you look at it".

Some of the British group Clean Bandit's tracks have been compared to the band, notably their 2016 UK No. 1 single "Rockabye".  Band members Grace and Luke have named them as an influence in interviews.

American alternative rock artist Beck had plans to cover an Ace of Base album as part of his Record Club project in 2009; however, this never came to fruition. Tegan and Sara's song "Closer" was inspired by the band's music. Robert Alfons of Canadian synthpop group Trust once said "the synthesisers they used were of great influence on me... [their] first two albums [in particular]", whilst rock band Yeasayer and new wave artist Twin Shadow have both also cited Ace of Base as an influence.

The 2019 single "Liar", by Cuban pop singer Camila Cabello, interpolates the melody of "All That She Wants".

Awards and nominations
 1993 Popcorn Music Awards - Best Album - Happy Nation 
 1993 Popcorn Music Awards - Best Song & Video - All That She Wants 
 1993 Swedish Grammis – Best Pop Group
 1993 Swedish Grammis – TV audience price
 1993 Bronze BRAVO Otto (Germany) – Best rock/pop Group
 1993 Swedish Dance Music Awards - Best Breakthrough Artist
 1994 MTV Europe Music Awards – Best Cover (Nominee)
 1994 American Music Award – Favorite Band, Duo or Group – Pop / Rock
 1994 American Music Award – Favorite New Artist – Pop / Rock
 1994 Billboard Music Award – Number One Single
 1994 Billboard Music Award – Top New Artist
 1994 Billboard Music Award – Artist of the Year
 1994 Peleg Music Award of Excellence – Best New Artist
 1994 World Music Award – World's Best-Selling Scandinavian Recording Artists of the Year
 1994 Echo (Germany) – Group of the Year
 1994 Swedish Dance Music Awards - Best Swedish Dance Artist
 1994 Swedish Dance Music Awards - Best Swedish Dance Album (nominee)
 1995 Grammy Awards – Best Pop Album for The Sign (nominee)
 1995 Grammy Awards – Best New Artist (nominee)
 1995 Grammy Awards – Best Vocal Performance By a Group or Duo for The Sign (nominee)
 1995 World Music Award – World's Best-Selling Scandinavian Recording Artists of the Year
 1995 Juno Awards – International Album of the Year for The Sign (nominee)
 1995 Swedish Dance Music Awards - Best Swedish Dance Artist (nominee)
 1996 European Award For Dance Music
 1996 World Music Award – World's Best-Selling Scandinavian Recording Artists of the Year
 1997 World Music Award – World's Best-Selling Scandinavian Recording Artists of the Year
 1998 Midem Fono Award – Most Played Song of the Year – Life Is a Flower
 1999 RSH Gold
 2007 BMI Award for over 3 million performances of The Sign on US TV and radio
 2011 Scandipop Award – Best group album 
 2016 BMI Award for over 4 million performances of The Sign on US TV and radio
 2021 BMI Award for over 5 million performances of The Sign on US TV and radio

Discography

Studio albums
Happy Nation / The Sign (1992/1993)
The Bridge (1995)
Flowers / Cruel Summer (1998)
Da Capo (2002) 
The Golden Ratio (2010)

See also
Swedish pop music

References

External links 

 
 
 [ Biography] on AllMusic
 

Ace of Base
Arista Records artists
English-language singers from Sweden
Europop groups
Musical groups established in 1990
Musical groups from Gothenburg
Swedish co-ed groups
Swedish Eurodance groups
Swedish pop music groups
Sibling musical groups
World Music Awards winners
1990 establishments in Sweden